Amaury III de Montfort († 18 or 19 April  1137) was a French nobleman, the seigneur de Montfort-l'Amaury, Épernon, and Houdan in the Île-de-France (1101–) and Count of Évreux in Normandy (1118–).

Life
Amaury was the son of Simon I, seigneur de Montfort, and his wife Agnès d'Évreux, daughter of Richard, Count of Évreux. In 1098, William Rufus was campaigning in France and crossed into the French Vexin. One of the first castles Rufus attacked was that of Houdan which Amaury III defended. But Amaury quickly surrendered and joined William's army. He then aided William II against his brother Simon II de Montfort's castles of Montfort-l'Amaury and Épernon. Simon and the other castellans successfully defended themselves against the forces of William Rufus until a truce was called and William returned to England. When Simon II died , Amaury succeeded him as seigneur de Montfort.

When his maternal uncle William, Count of Évreux died in 1118, he left no direct heirs so Henry I of England seized his lands. Amaury was Henry's most detested enemy.  His sister was the notorious Bertrade de Montfort, his nephew was Fulk V of Anjou, and his kinsman King Louis VI of France was related to him by marriage. Amaury had induced his nephew Fulk V to attack Henry's territories in the past while the French and English kings were at odds again. Amaury was the last person he wanted holding a countship in the center of Normandy. After complaining to Louis VI the French king granted the countship of Évreux to Amaury. For six months Henry kept Amaury out of Évreux and denied him the county by keeping the castle garrisoned with his own troops until his constable, William Pointel, turned the castle over to his longtime friend Amaury while Henry was in Rouen. Finally Henry offered Amaury the countship of Évreux if he would surrender the castle. Amaury refused and the rebellion continued with Amaury now encouraging more Normans to defy Henry. 

In 1119 Henry besieged the castle of Évreux anew, but Theobald II, Count of Champagne, Henry's nephew, negotiated a truce between them. Amaury surrendered the castle to the King and on doing so was confirmed as count of Évreux by Henry. The following year Amaury fought at the battle of Bourgtheroulde supporting William Clito against Henry I but was captured fleeing the field by William de Grandcourt. 
Rather than turn over his prisoner to Henry, however, William decided to go into exile with Amaury. Amaury made peace with the King later that same year and for the rest of Henry's reign remained on good terms with him.

Marriages and children 
He married firstly, Richilde de Hainaut, daughter of Baudouin II, comte de Hainaut but repudiated her in 1118.

In 1118 he remarried, to Agnès de Garlande, daughter of Anseau de Garlande, Count de Rochefort. Their children were:

 Amaury IV († 1140), Count of Évreux
 Simon III († 1181), lord of Montfort and Count of Évreux, whose daughter Bertrade married Hugh de Kevelioc, 5th Earl of Chester.
 Agnès († 1181), Dame de Gournay-sur-Marne, married Waleran de Beaumont, 1st Earl of Worcester († 1166)

Notes

References

Anglo-Normans
1137 deaths
Year of birth unknown
Seigneur of Montfort